Memorial Album may refer to:

 Memorial Album (Hank Williams album)
 Memorial (Clifford Brown album)
 Memorial Album (Clifford Brown album)
 Ritchie Valens Memorial Album
 Memorial Album (Bunny Berigan album)
 The Kenny Dorham Memorial Album 
 The Eddie Cochran Memorial Album

See also
 Memorial Collection, 2009 compilation album of Buddy Holly
 Memorial (Distorted album)
 Memorial (Russian Circles album)
 Memorial (Moonspell album)